Deen Dayal Upadhyaya College (informally known as DDUC) is one of the top constituent college of the University of Delhi in India, located at Phase 1, Dwarka Sector-3, Dwarka, New Delhi, Delhi 110078. It is fully funded by Government of Delhi. It was established in August 1990 in the memory of Deen Dayal Upadhyaya, a philosopher, thinker and social worker.

Academics

Academic programmes

The college, informally known as DDUC, offers many undergraduate courses, including BA, B.Sc. and B.Com. programs.
In order to cater to business and management education at the undergraduate level, a three-year Bachelor of Business Studies was inaugurated on 18 July 2007.

Ranking
In 2021, Deen Dayal Upadhyaya College was ranked 13th among colleges in India by National Institutional Ranking Framework.

Admissions 
The admission process for BMS is different from the regular cut-offs based on Class XII results, as followed in other colleges of the university. The Faculty of Management Studies, undertakes the responsibility for admissions in the course BMS. Selection criteria for prospective students consist of the following (weightage in admission decisions given in brackets)

1. An objective written test, the Joint Entrance Test (JAT) – includes a wide variety of questions on verbal skills, quantitative skills, logic, business knowledge, and current affairs. (65%)

2. (35%) marks scored in class 12th board examination.

The admission test is highly competitive with only 400 seats and a selection ratio of 1:50.

Student life

Cultural festivals
The college's student life includes various student organizations (both academic and cultural) which organize extra curricular activities.

Kalrav is the annual festival of DDUC, usually organized in February–March each year. It is a conglomerate of the activities of all societies and departments of the college. Kalrav seeks participation of students pan-India and has events & competitions including those of Music, Dance, Drama, Debating, Model UN, Quizzes and many more informal events. The Star nights at Kalrav in the previous years have witnessed performances by youth icons like Mika, Indian Ocean, The Circus etc.

Ecclesia is the annual convention of Department of Management Studies, DDUC.

Zucitva is the Annual Commerce Festival of DDUC organized by the Department of Commerce every year and include events like Corporate Fashion Show, Forensic Accounting, Business Plan, Marketing Management Competition, Mock Stock, etc. The fest is organized every year by CommUnity, The Department Of Commerce.

Tech Marathon is the Annual Computer Science Festival of DDUC organized by the Sanganika (The Computer Science Society).

KALAMKAAR the Hindi kavi sammelan was organised in the college on 18 February on the behalf of silver jubilee year. Under the banner of KALAMKAR a literature festival named 'KLF' is organised every year, during this festival society also organised a mega Kavi-Sammelan.

Student societies
There are many academic and cultural societies that are open for all DDUC students to join. Some of them include:
 Women Development Cell: The one which is dedicated only for the Women development. 
 DDUC Photography Society : The photography Society 
 Vyaktitva – The Personality Development Society 
 180 Degrees Consulting DDUC: Consulting club of DDUC, branch of the world's largest university based consulting organization
Entrepreneurship Development Cell DDUC : The Entrepreneurship Cell that comes under the Department of Management studies 
 Synapses – The Zoological Society (Department of Zoology)
 HCMS - Harish Chandra Mathematics Society ( Department of Mathematics)
 Optizone - The Operational Research Society ( Department of Mathematical Sciences)
 Aryabhatta Science Forum (Department of Physics)
 Zest – Department of English
 Sanganika – the computer science society
 Covalence – Department of Chemistry
 CommUNITY – Department of Commerce
 Kalpavriksha- the botanical society (Department of Botany)
 Delonix – annual festival of Department of Botany
 Astral- the management society of Department of Management Studies
 SILIZIUM- Society of Dept. Of Electronics
 Robotics Club
 National Service Scheme
Social Responsibility Cell DDUC
 Kalamkaar – the literary society
 Yavanika – the theatre society.
 Sangyaan- the quizzing society
 Voices – the debating society
 Rhapsody – the music society
 The Model UN Club
 Raaga – the dance society
 Fin-S – the finance society
 Eco Club
 Spic Macay
 Reflections – the magazine society
 Career Aspirants Club – the competitive examination preparation club
 Vyoma – the astro club

Hostels 
There are 2 hostels, boys and girls, having 90 limited seats each. Facilities such as air conditioning, attached bathroom, WiFi and many others are provided to students living far away from home. The rooms are allotted on twin sharing basis. And the motto is to provide students with a comfortable and convenient stay.

The process of admission into the hostel is different, considering the aggregate of the 12th class of students along with their distance from homes. Candidates are required to fill out an application form with the Hostel within the scheduled dates as per Notification for Hostel Accommodation.

References

External links
Official College Website
BBS @ DDUC
DDUC @ DU
Eng (H) @ DDUC
Melange – Annual Fest – Department of Business Studies

Universities and colleges in Delhi
Delhi University
1990 establishments in Delhi
Memorials to Deendayal Upadhyay
Educational institutions established in 1990